Graham High School is a public high school in St. Paris, Ohio. It is the only high school in the Graham Local School District.

History
Graham High School was constructed in 1957, the same year that Graham Local School District was formed. There have been several major renovations to the school, including the addition of a science wing, updated offices, and a new football stadium. A $13 million renovation took place in June 2009.

Athletics
Sports at Graham include: football, boys' and girls' basketball, baseball, softball, wrestling, track & field, cross country, girls' volleyball, boys' and girls' golf, and boys' and girls' soccer. Graham High School is Division III in football, while all other sports are Division II. Graham's colors are black and white and the Falcon is their mascot. Graham's major rivals are the Hillclimbers of the neighboring town of Urbana, Ohio. Graham is a member of Central Buckeye Conference (CBC). The conference is divided into two divisions: The Kenton Trail Division, which includes Bellefontaine, Jonathan Alder, Kenton Ridge, London, Shawnee, and Tecumseh. The Mad River Division includes Benjamin Logan, Graham, Indian Lake, North Union, Northwestern, and Urbana.

Ohio High School Athletic Association State Championships

Boys' Baseball – 1930, 1973
Boys' Team Wrestling – 1982, 1998, 2001, 2002, 2003, 2004, 2005, 2006, 2007, 2008, 2009, 2010, 2011, 2012, 2013, 2014, 2015, 2016, 2017, 2018, 2019, 2021, 2022
 Boys' Wrestling-Team Dual Meet - 2013, 2014, 2015, 2016, 2017, 2018, 2019, 2021, 2022

Notable alumni
 Jim Jordan, Member of the U.S. House of Representatives from Ohio's 4th district
 Dustin Schlatter, amateur wrestler
 David Taylor, Olympic gold medalist wrestler

References

External links
District Website

High schools in Champaign County, Ohio
Public high schools in Ohio
1957 establishments in Ohio